Elements of the Philosophy of Right is a work by Georg Wilhelm Friedrich Hegel published in 1820, though the book's original title page dates it to 1821. Hegel's most mature statement of his legal, moral, social and political philosophy, it is an expansion upon concepts only briefly dealt with in the Encyclopedia of the Philosophical Sciences, published in 1817 (and again in 1827 and 1830). Law provides for Hegel the cornerstone of the modern state. As such, he criticized Karl Ludwig von Haller's The Restoration of the Science of the State, in which the latter claimed that law was superficial, because natural law and the "right of the most powerful" was sufficient. The absence of law characterized for Hegel despotism, whether absolutist or ochlocracist.

Summary
The Philosophy of Right (as it is usually called) begins with a discussion of the concept of the free will and argues that the free will can only realize itself in the complicated social context of property rights and relations, contracts, moral commitments, family life, the economy, the legal system, and the polity. A person is not truly free, in other words, unless they are a participant in all of these different aspects of the life of the state.

The bulk of the book is devoted to discussing Hegel's three spheres or versions of 'right,' each one larger than the preceding ones and encompassing them. The first sphere is abstract right (Recht), in which Hegel discusses the idea of 'non-interference' as a way of respecting others. He deems this insufficient and moves onto the second sphere, morality (Moralität). Under this, Hegel proposes that humans reflect their own subjectivity of others in order to respect them. The third sphere, ethical life (Sittlichkeit), is Hegel's integration of individual subjective feelings and universal notions of right. Under ethical life, Hegel then launches into a lengthy discussion about family, civil society, and the state.

Hegel also argues that the state itself is subsumed under the higher totality of world history, in which individual states arise, conflict with each other, and eventually fall. The course of history is apparently toward the ever-increasing actualization of freedom; each successive historical epoch corrects certain failures of the earlier ones. At the end of his Lectures on the Philosophy of History, Hegel leaves open the possibility that history has yet to accomplish certain tasks related to the inner organization of the state.

Reception 

There were a number of issues that arose during the translation of the text. Most notably the phrase that is contained in the addition to §258, which was initially translated as "The state is the march of God through the world" as well as being translated thus: "The existence of the state is the presence of God upon the earth". From these early translations came the criticism that Hegel justifies authoritarian or even totalitarian forms of government: Giovanni Gentile, whose thought had a strong influence on Mussolini, bases his Hegelian revival on this point. However, Walter Kaufmann argues that the correct translation reads as follows: "It is the way of God in the world, that there should be a state". This suggests that the state, rather than being godly, is part of the divine strategy, not a mere product of human endeavor. Kaufmann claims that Hegel's original meaning of the sentence is not a carte blanche for state dominance and brutality but merely a reference to the state's importance as part of the process of history.

The preface to the Philosophy of Right contains considerable criticism of the philosophy of Jakob Friedrich Fries, who had been a critic of Hegel's prior work. Included in this is a suggestion that it is justifiable for the state to censor the writings of philosophers like Fries and welcoming Fries' loss of his academic position following Fries' participation in the Wartburg Festival. The inclusion of this passage has led to scholarly debate as to the reason for Hegel's advocacy of the kind of censorship the Prussian state had introduced following the murder of August von Kotzebue in the form of the Carlsbad Decrees. Hegel scholars have suggested that the inclusion of these passages was done to satisfy the censors. T.M. Knox argued that, while clearly designed to curry favour with the censors and written well after completion of the work proper, the Preface's condemnation of Fries was "nothing new", that there was no betrayal of his support for the Wartburg Festival principles, rather a mere denunciation of method, while condemnation of Karl Ludwig von Haller (whose work had been burned at Wartburg) remained undisturbed in the body of the work. Stephen Houlgate writes that Hegel's work is now recognized as "one of the greatest works of social and political philosophy ever written."

References

External links
 
 
 Philosophy of Right – translation into English, 1896
 Complete PDF of the Philosophy of Right (McMaster University)
 Complete PDF of the Philosophy of Right (University of Warsaw)
 Preface of the Philosophy of Right at Marxist Reference Archive
 Redding, Paul, "Georg Wilhelm Friedrich Hegel", The Stanford Encyclopedia of Philosophy

1820 non-fiction books
Works by Georg Wilhelm Friedrich Hegel
Ethics books
Philosophy of law
Social philosophy literature
Political philosophy literature